The Jerusalem Herald is an Israeli English-language digital news site that presents analysis and commentary from a Jewish religious Zionist perspective. The Jerusalem Herald was co-founded in 2017 by journalists Ari Yashar and Dr. Nancy G. Sher, and is headquartered in Jerusalem, Israel. It is a division of Yashar Communications.

History 
The Jerusalem Herald website commenced publication on June 15, 2017. Regarding the site's impetus and mission, it states: "An unsupportable and dangerous status quo confronts Jews in Israel today, as we face challenges from within and without. ...Non-mainstream opinion is frequently delegitimized by the media and the state establishment and forcibly excluded from the public discourse, leading to dangerous narrow thinking. The world’s pro-Israel community needs invigorating discourse and energizing thinking regarding the future of Israel as the Jewish homeland. The Jewish community needs a viable medium to discuss Jewish life and the Jewish state in all its complexity. For this reason, we launched The Jerusalem Herald — a professional English-language media website presenting analysis and commentary from a Jewish nationalist religious perspective."As noted in the website's footer, the name of the publication is taken from the Book of Isaiah (chapter 40, verse 9): "Raise your voice with strength, herald of Jerusalem; raise it, do not be afraid; say to the cities of Judah, 'Here is your G-d!'"

The Jerusalem Herald's articles have been cited by Arutz Sheva, reprinted by Israeli Frontline and the San Diego Jewish World, and translated into Italian by L'Informale. The site has also been promoted by Israel News Talk Radio.

Coverage 
The Jerusalem Herald's content is focused on six categories of coverage as listed on the site: The Jewish State, Judaism and Culture, World Stage, IDF and Security, Muslim World, and Weather.

Authors who have contributed articles to the site include Israel Institute for Strategic Studies founder and director Martin Sherman, former Israeli Ambassador to the U.S. Yoram Ettinger, activist group Boomerang - Fighting for Israel, journalist Moshe Dann, writer Brandon Marlon, Rabbi Chananya Weissman, veteran Israeli tour guide Shalom Pollack, and others.

Logo 
According to the site, The Jerusalem Herald logo "incorporates the design of the Choshen (priestly breastplate) worn by the Kohen Gadol (High Priest) in Biblical times. The 12  jewels of the Choshen represent the 12 tribes of the Jewish People — in other words, the entire nation. In ancient times, the nation would consult the Urim and Tumim of the Choshen for divine guidance from G-d about how to successfully deal with the burning questions of the day. This symbolizes the mission of The Jerusalem Herald to analyze current events and try to figure out what we as Jews should do according to G-d's will."

References 

Israeli news websites
Jewish newspapers